Taractrocera ilia, the northern grass-dart or rock grass-dart, is a butterfly of the family Hesperiidae. It is found in Irian Jaya, Australia's Northern Territory (Darwin and Melville Island) and Papua New Guinea (Morobe, Madang, East Sepik and Western Highlands).

The wingspan is about 20 mm.

Subspecies
Taractrocera ilia ilia Waterhouse, 1932 (Northern Territory)
Taractrocera ilia beta Evans, 1934 (Papua New Guinea)

External links
Australian Insects
Australian Faunal Directory

Taractrocerini
Butterflies described in 1932